Campbell Bay is an Arctic waterway in Kitikmeot Region, Nunavut, Canada. It is located on the south side of the Queen Maud Gulf, east of White Bear Point on Nunavut's mainland.

Labyrinth Bay, Foggy Bay and Conolly Bay are nearby.

Geography
It has a soft mud bottom.

References

Bays of Kitikmeot Region